A. Michael Baldwin (born Michael M. Baldwin; April 4, 1963) is an American actor, producer, and screenwriter. He came to public notice as a child actor, appearing as Mike Pearson in Phantasm (1979) and its sequels.

Biography
Baldwin was born in Los Angeles, California, the son of animator Gerard Baldwin, who worked on classic shows such as The Jetsons, Rocky and Bullwinkle, and George of the Jungle. Michael Baldwin began acting in his teens and was also a member of the Teenage Drama Workshop at California State University.  He is best known for his roles as Mike in the Phantasm films (except for Phantasm II). Baldwin practices Eastern Mysticism, and in the 1980s, he temporarily left acting to explore his spirituality. Some of his latest accomplishments are writing, producing, and appearing in Vice Girls, and its sequel.  He has also taught acting classes and workshops in Los Angeles. In May 2015 Baldwin was part of the Phantasm Reunion at Texas Frightmare Weekend. He currently lives in Austin, Texas, with his two children and fiancé.

Personal life
As of March 2005, he teaches acting in Austin, Texas.

Filmography

References

External links

American male child actors
American male film actors
American male television actors
1963 births
Living people
20th-century American male actors
21st-century American male actors
Male actors from Los Angeles
Male actors from Austin, Texas